István Szondy (29 December 1925 – 31 May 2017) was a Hungarian modern pentathlete, horse rider and Olympic champion who competed at the 1948, 1952 and the 1956 Summer Olympics.

Olympics
Szondy received a gold medal in the team modern pentathlon event at the 1952 Summer Olympics in Helsinki and a bronze in the individual event.

References

1925 births
2017 deaths
Hungarian male modern pentathletes
Olympic modern pentathletes of Hungary
Hungarian male equestrians
Olympic equestrians of Hungary
Modern pentathletes at the 1948 Summer Olympics
Modern pentathletes at the 1952 Summer Olympics
Equestrians at the 1956 Summer Olympics
Olympic gold medalists for Hungary
Olympic bronze medalists for Hungary
Olympic medalists in modern pentathlon
People from Berettyóújfalu
World Modern Pentathlon Championships medalists
Medalists at the 1952 Summer Olympics
Sportspeople from Hajdú-Bihar County
20th-century Hungarian people
21st-century Hungarian people